Polynucleobacter duraquae is an aerobic, chemo-organotrophic, catalase- and oxidase-positive, sometimes motile, free-living bacterium of the genus Polynucleobacter, isolated from Lake Mondsee in Austria. The species represents planktonic bacteria (bacterioplankton) dwelling in alkaline freshwater systems.

References

External links
Type strain of Polynucleobacter duraquae at BacDive -  the Bacterial Diversity Metadatabase

Burkholderiaceae
Bacteria described in 2016